Veronika Valk (born 21 November 1976 in Tallinn) is an Estonian architect.

Biography 
Veronika Valk graduated from Tallinn 21. Keskkool with gold medal in 1994. She studied in the Estonian Academy of Arts in the department of architecture and city planning. She graduated from the academy in 2001 with master's degree, cum laude. From 1996 to 1997 she studied in the Rhode Island School of Design.

In 2009, she received Estonian Cultural Endowment National Annual Award in architecture for Lasva Water Tower conversion into an Art Gallery (with Kadri Klementi, Kalle-Priit Pruuden, Peeter Laurits, Kalle Tikas).

From 1998 to 2002 Veronika Valk practiced as a freelance architect. From 2002 to 2005 Veronika Valk was founder, partner and architect in the Kavakava LLC architectural bureau. From 2005 to 2008 Veronika Valk was AD an co-producer of Tallinn Festival of Light, Valgusfestival. From 2004 to 2008 she was teaching at the Estonian Academy of Arts. In 2005 she founded, and to present works in the Zizi&Yoyo LLC. Since 2006, she is board member of NGO Kultuurikatel.

Most notable works by Veronika Valk are the central square of Rakvere, the sports hall of the Suure-Jaani Gymnasium, the monument of the composer Eduard Tubin and the reconstruction of the Lasva water tower. In addition Veronika Valk has successfully participated in numerous architectural competitions, won several awards, published over one hundred articles on architecture and urbanism. Veronika Valk is a member of the Union of Estonian Architects since 2001 (council member from 2004 to 2008). She has been council member of architecture magazine Ehituskunst and design magazine RUUM.

Works
Central square of Rakvere, 2000 (with Villem Tomiste and Ott Kadarik)
Reconstruction of the Steineri garden in Pärnu, 2001 (with Villem Tomiste)
Monument of Eduard Tubin in Tartu, 2006 (with sculptor Aili Vahtrapuu and sound designer Louis Dandrel)
Sports hall of the Suure-Jaani Gymnasium, 2005
Reconstruction of the Lasva water tower into an info point and art gallery 2009
Interior design and landscaping of the Tarvastu kindergarten, 2009
Single-family homes in Merirahu area, Tallinn

Competitions
2008 I Tallinn (EE) I Poetess Marie Under Monument design competition (with Kirke Kangro), Honorable Mention
2007 I Viljandi (EE) I Arkaadia promenade landscaping competition, winning entry
2007 I Tallinn (EE) I Maakri District urban planning competition (with Leena Torim, Kadri Klementi, Tõnis Arjus, Eerik Kändler), 1st phase runner-up
2005 I Tallinn (EE) I Pae  recreation park landscaping competition (with Kerli Raamsalu), winning entry
2005 I Tallinn (EE) I at Virgin Mary Russian orthodox church design competition (with Yoko Alender), Special Mention
2004 I Viljandi (EE) I Metsakalmistu Cemetery Chapel design competition (with Yoko Alender and Tuuli Köller),  Special Mention
2004 I Tartu (EE) I Composer Eduard Tubin’s memorial design competition (with sculptor Aili Vahtrapuu),  winning entry
2004 I Tallinn (EE) I Estonian Interior Defence Academy urban planning competition (with Kavakava architects), winning entry
2003 I Tallinn (EE) I “New Sakala” arthouse cinema architecture competition, 1st phase runner-up
2003 I Tallinn (EE) I Music Centre architecture competition (with Kavakava architects), Honorable Mention
2003 I Tallinn (EE) I Kalev Chocolate Factory and Tallinn Dairy Factory urban planning competition, 3rd prize
2002 I Tallinn (EE) I Mustjõe dwelling area urban planning competition, 3rd prize
2002 I London (UK) I Pilkington Glasshouse architecture competition, 1st commendment
2002 I Tallinn (EE) I at Tallinn entrance sign design competition (with Mariann Valk), winning entry
2001 I Pärnu (EE) I Pärnu Highschool sports hall architecture competition (with Viilem Tomiste), Honorable Mention
2001 I Võru (EE) I Olympic Park reconstruction landscaping competition (with Villem Tomiste), winning entry
2001 I Tallinn (EE) I Highschool No21 reconstruction architecture competition (with Villem Tomiste), 3rd prize
2001 I Pärnu (EE) I Steiner Garden landscaping design competition (with Villem Tomiste), winning entry
2001 I Narva (EE) I Narva City Centre urban planning competition (with Villem Tomiste), Honorable Mention
2000  I Tallinn (EE) I Tallinn Waterfront Area urban development competition (with Villem Tomiste), winning entry
2000  I Tartu (EE) I Ecological Building architecture competition (with Villem Tomiste), Two  Honorable Mentions
2000  I Tallinn (EE) I Lasnamäe Sports Center architecture competition (with Villem Tomiste and Ott Kadarik), Two  Honorable Mentions
2000  I Suure-Jaani (EE) I Suure-Jaani Highschool Sports Centre architecture competition, winning entry
2000  I Tartu (EE) I Baltic Defence College Square landscaping competition, winning entry
1999  I Tartu (EE) I Tartu University Dormitory architecture competition, 3rd  prize
1999  I Põlva (EE) I Põlva City Centre urban planning competition (with Villem Tomiste and Ott Kadarik), Honorable Mention
1999  I Võru (EE) I Võru City Centre urban planning competition (with Villem Tomiste and Ott Kadarik), Honorable Mention
1999  I Kaali (EE) I Meteoritics Museum architecture competition (with Villem Tomiste), 2nd  prize
1999  I Rakvere (EE) I Rakvere City Center urban planning competition (with Villem Tomiste and Ott Kadarik), winning entry
1998  I Väike-Munamäe (EE) I Väike-Munamäe Ski Center architecture competition, 2nd  prize

Installation art
2010 New York (US) ‘Brooklyn Ad Night’ screening in public space (with Ed Kimball and Karin Laansoo), PointB worklodge
2010 Stockholm (SE) ‘Building Blocks’ exhibition on architecture commissioned by children, Färgfabriken
2009 Tallinn (EE) architectural installation JOHAN:23 for Tallinn Design Night (with Johan Tali and Siim Tuksam)
2009 Ljubljana (SL) Svetlobna Gverila festival of light / lighting design installation Pattern (with Katri Kikkas)
2008 Beijing (CH) Creating Spaces – art bridge between EU and China / artworks Beijing Tricycle, Creativity Stamp, Scrubber
2007 Pärnu (EE) Set design for Kajakas (The Seagull, by A. Chekhov) at Endla Theatre
2006 Eindhoven (NL) GLOW festival / urban artwork Swinging In the Light
2006 Cardiff (UK) Urban Legacies II: New Babylon / indoor pneumatic installation Mikrouun
2007..2006 Lyon (FR) Fête des Lumières: Superflux / outdoor pneumatic installation Mikrouun
2008..2005 Tallinn (EE) lighting design installations Light Dome, Iglu, Swinging in the Light etc. for Tallinn Festival of Light Valgusfestival

Exhibitions
2004 Hansalite, Tallinn, Arhitektuuri- ja Disainigalerii
2005 Young European Architects, Rotterdam, Netherlands Architecture Institute
2005 Designmai, Berlin
2008 BOOM/ROOM NEW ESTONIAN ARCHITECTURE, Tallinn, The Museum of Estonian Architecture
2009 Protsendiaeg, Tallinn, The Museum of Estonian Architecture

Talks
2010 New York (US), PointB worklodge
2010 Aarhus (DK), Ȧrhus School of Architecture
2010 Gent (BE) Fragile conference at Sint-Lucas School of Architecture
2010 Melbourne (AU), Affirmative Architecture conference at RMIT University School of Architecture and Design
2010 Tallinn (EE), TEDx Tallinn, KUMU Museum of Estonian Art
2009 Tallinn (EE), Pecha Kucha Night, Tallinn Design Night (Prooviveski in Rotermanni quarters)
2009 Melbourne (AU), Parallax conference
2008 Beijing (CH), Tsinghua University, Department of Art & Design
2008 Tallinn (EE), Tallinn Vision Conference 2008
2008 Tallinn (EE), III Baltic Sea Region Energy Dialogue
2007 Tokyo (JA), New Trends of Architecture in Europe and Asia-Pacific 2006-2007, Showa Women’s University
2006 Patras (GR), New Trends of Architecture in Europe and Asia-Pacific 2006-2007, University of Patras
2004 Tokyo (JA), Pecha Kucha Night at Superdeluxe by Klein Dytham architecture

References

Union of Estonian Architects, members
Zizi&Yoyo OÜ, Veronika Valk CV
Noore Arhitekti Preemia nominendid

External links
Veronika Valk on Estonian architecture and Tallinn in Dwell magazine
Veronika Valk in Archiprix
Making light work of darkness
E.Tubin's monument in architecture magazine A10

1976 births
Living people
Architects from Tallinn
Estonian women architects
Rhode Island School of Design alumni